Gustavo Bolívar Moreno (born July 22, 1966, Girardot, Cundinamarca) is a prolific Colombian author, screenwriter, and journalist, who was elected to the Senate of Colombia in 2018 as a member of the leftist Humane Colombia. 

He published several books before the best-seller Sin Tetas No Hay Paraíso (Spanish for Without Tits There Is No Paradise) brought him international fame.  There are three adaptations for television: a series produced by the Colombian company Caracol (2006), a version by RTI Colombia–Telemundo and a version by Spain's Telecinco. The novel also was adapted to a film directed by Bolívar himself.

He is also known for writing the novel El capo and later adapting it to a telenovela. He also was the creator of the telenovelas Victorinos, Ojo por ojo and Tres Caínes.

He is the only senator to donate his entire salary to social works and to a digital media, Cuarto de hora.

Adaptations
 Sin Senos No Hay Paraíso (Telemundo series)
 Without Breasts There is No Paradise (NBC series)
 Sin senos sí hay paraíso (Telemundo series)

References

External links
 
 Personal Site 

20th-century Colombian novelists
21st-century Colombian novelists
Colombian male novelists
Living people
1966 births
People from Cundinamarca Department